HD share is a now defunct video sharing website where users could upload, view and share video clips.

HD share was launched on 1 July 2008.
The site uses Flash Video to display content.

HD share was one of the first websites to exclusively host high definition videos.

Sometime in 2011 HD share was shut down after it sales to United Social Networks LLC based in New York. The company used their technology to develop niche social networks.

Technical Informations 
HD share's video playback technology was based on Macromedia's Flash Player.  This technology allows the site to display videos with quality comparable to more established video playback technologies (such as Windows Media Player, QuickTime and RealPlayer) that generally require the user to download and install a web browser plugin in order to view video.  Flash also requires a plug-in, but Adobe considers the Flash 7 plug-in to be present on about 90% of online computers. Users can view videos in windowed mode or full screen mode and it is possible to switch modes during playback without reloading it due to the full-screen function of Adobe Flash Player 9. The video can also be played back with third-party media players such as GOM Player, gnash, VLC as well as some ffmpeg-based video players.

Videos uploaded to HD share weren't limited in length and had a maximum size of 4 Gigabytes. The best format that HD share could display was 1280*720.
Video formats: Cinepak, DV, H.263, H.264/MPEG-4 AVC, HuffYUV, Indeo, MJPEG, MPEG-1, MPEG-2, MPEG-4 Part 2, RealVideo, Sorenson, Theora, WMV
Audio formats: AAC, AC3, ALAC, AMR, FLAC, Intel Music Coder, Monkey's Audio, MP3, RealAudio, Shorten, Speex, Vorbis, WMA

History 
HD share was created in the begin of 2008 as a project between 3 young students in Switzerland. The website was launched in test version the 1st July 2008, the website was then upgraded few times before a closure in 2010 due to an uncertain future. In 2011 the company was acquired by United Social Networks who is devoted for the development of the website worldwide and to open video sharing markets to small communities.

Restart of operations 
On September 29, 2010, HD share and USN announced the restart of the development operations and the soon reopening of the website. The aim of the company is to become the best video portal where users can share only quality videos (HD).
In July 2011 the new version is online but still in beta version waiting for the tests.

The Shared Haemodialysis Care vision is for people who receive dialysis at centres to have the opportunity and information to participate in aspects of their treatment and thereby improve their experience and their outcomes.

External links 
  HD share website
  LOKI Group

References 

American entertainment websites
Internet properties established in 2008
Multilingual websites
Defunct social networking services
Former video hosting services
Defunct video on demand services